Epsilon Herculis, Latinized from ε Herculis, is a fourth-magnitude multiple star system in the northern constellation of Hercules.  The combined apparent visual magnitude of 3.9111 is bright enough to make this system visible to the naked eye. Based upon an annual parallax shift of 21.04 mas as seen from Earth, it is located 155 light years from the Sun. The system is moving closer to the Sun with a radial velocity of −25 km/s.

There is disagreement over the properties of this system. Petrie (1939) classified two components as class A0 and A2 with a visual magnitude difference of 1.5. Batten et al. (1989) catalogued it as a double-lined spectroscopic binary system with an orbital period of four days and an eccentricity of 0.02. However, Hipparcos was not able to detect the duplicity. Tokovinin (1997) and Faraggiana et al. (2001) catalogued it as a triple star system. Cowley et al. (1969) gave it a combined stellar classification of  A0 V, whereas Gray & Garrison (1987) classified it as an A0 IV+. Wolff & Preston (1978) listed a magnesium overabundance. Since 1995 it has been classified as a Lambda Boötis star, although this has been brought into question.

References

External links 
Jim Kaler's Stars, University of Illinois: EPS HER (Epsilon Herculis)

A-type main-sequence stars
Binary stars
Triple stars
Hercules (constellation)
Herculis, Epsilon
Durchmusterung objects
Herculis, 058
153808
083207
6324